The  Mother Teresa Awards, officially called the  Mother Teresa Memorial Awards for Social Justice, are international and national awards presented annually to honour individuals and organizations that promote peace, equality and social justice, and aim to encourage the cause of justice and peaceful coexistence, while providing an impetus for society to imbibe these values. The awards are given in honour of Mother Teresa.

History and structure
Mother Teresa Awards have been given since 2004 annually or biannually. They are an initiative of Harmony Foundation, an organization created by Abraham Mathai in Mumbai. It is the only award in the name of Mother Teresa reviewed and recognized by Sister Prema, Superior General of Missionaries of Charity. 

The awards are reviewed by a board of patrons that comprises Abraham Mathai — founder chairman and former vice-chairman of National Commission for Minorities, Baroness Caroline Cox — member and former deputy chairperson of House of Lords, Mahesh Bhatt — filmmaker, P. C. Thomas — politician, Tushar Gandhi — Great-grandson of Mahatma Gandhi, Flavia Agnes — women's rights activist, and Shazia Ilmi — Journalist and politician.

Awardees

References

External links
theharmonyfoundation.org
motherteresaawards.org

Humanitarian_and_service_awards
Awards established in 2005
Memorials to Mother Teresa
International awards